Harold Ambrose Patten (October 6, 1907 - September 6, 1969) was a Representative in the United States House of Representatives from Arizona.

Biography
Patten was born in Husted, Colorado on October 6, 1907. In 1916, he moved to Tucson, Arizona. He graduated from the University of Arizona in 1930, and was a coach and teacher of physical education in Tucson High School in 1931 and 1932. He served as director of recreation for the city of Tucson and city schools from 1933 to 1939, and was the State director of recreation in 1939 and 1940.

Entering military service with the Seventh Cavalry Regiment as a first lieutenant in August 1940, he was transferred to the Air Corps in 1941 and spent thirty-one months on foreign service in Africa and Italy. He was discharged as a major on November 21, 1945, and retired July 1, 1960, as a lieutenant colonel in the Air Force Reserve.

He worked as a life insurance agent in Phoenix from 1946 to 1948, and began his political career as a Democrat elected to the 81st, 82nd, and 83rd United States Congresses, serving from January 3, 1949 to January 3, 1955. He was not a candidate for renomination in 1954 and was defeated for the Democratic nomination in 1961 to fill a vacancy in the 87th United States Congress. He resumed his career in the insurance field, and in 1965, was appointed to head a Federal Job Corps Center in Oregon. In this capacity, he organized and directed a Center at Malheur Wildlife Refuge and was director of Center offices in Portland, Oregon.

He died in Tucson, Arizona on September 6, 1969, and willed his body to University of Arizona College of Medicine for research purposes.

References

1907 births
1969 deaths
University of Arizona alumni
Democratic Party members of the United States House of Representatives from Arizona
20th-century American politicians
Politicians from Tucson, Arizona